Edmondo "Eddie" Della Siepe (born May 2, 1981) is a Canadian stand-up comedian and actor. He frequently appeared on MuchMusic's hit show  Video on Trial and Love Court.

Early life
Eddie Della Siepe was born and raised in Toronto, Ontario. His father Antonio immigrated to Canada from Italy and his mother Elvia is from Peru. Della Siepe attended York Memorial Colligate Institute in Toronto, where he excelled in the drama program and was involved in many school productions. 

In his early years he idolized Jim Carrey, and from the age of 12 he had aspirations of becoming a stand-up comedian. His first attempt at stand-up comedy was at age 17 while still attending high school, and with a lackluster experience he decided to wait until the time was right to attempt stand-up again. At age 19 he enrolled at York University in Toronto, where he majored in sociology. While attending university he decided to focus on performing stand-up comedy again, and started performing at local amateur nights and open mics.

Career

Stand-up
Della Siepe is a national touring headliner and a regular in the Toronto comedy scene. He has co-featured in two MuchMusic sponsored national stand-up comedy tours, the Jury Duty tour and Jury Duty 2: Even Jurier. He has also appeared at the LOL Comedy Festival in Sudbury and the Just for Laughs Festival in Montreal. He has performed at the Comedy Store and The Improv in Hollywood, California.

Television
Della Siepe has been featured in over 30 episodes of Video on Trial.  In 2009 he co-starred in all 20 episodes of MuchMusic's reality dating show Love Court, hosted by Canadian recording artist Elise Estrada. In January 2010 he recorded a 30-minute "Comedy Now" stand-up special for CTV and The Comedy Network, which aired in 2011.

Film
In 2004 Della Siepe was cast as a lead in the modern-day war drama American Soldiers by Hollywood director Sidney Furie. He was featured in two well-received independent films, Smoked and Master Plan, both official selections of the Queens Film Festival in New York, the Los Angeles Film Festival, and New York Film & Video Festival.

Filmography

Discography
I Think I've Changed (2015)
little jerk (2020)

References

External links
 Eddie Della Siepe's official website
 

Living people
Canadian stand-up comedians
Comedians from Toronto
Male actors from Toronto
Canadian television personalities
Canadian people of Peruvian descent
Canadian people of Italian descent
1981 births
Canadian male comedians
Canadian sketch comedians
21st-century Canadian comedians